Peter Bailey (born 16 August 1939) is an Australian former cricketer. He played ones first-class cricket match for Victoria in 1960.

See also
 List of Victoria first-class cricketers

References

External links
 

1939 births
Living people
Australian cricketers
Victoria cricketers
Cricketers from Melbourne